William M. Brown (1838 – after 1882) was an English-born political figure in British Columbia. He represented Lillooet in the Legislative Assembly of British Columbia from 1874 to 1882.

He was born in Yorkshire and came to Wisconsin in 1842, where he was educated. In 1862, Brown moved to British Columbia. He was first elected to the assembly in an 1874 by-election held after William Saul and Thomas Basil Humphreys both resigned their seats in a "dispute between the two gentlemen as to which represents the popular feeling of the district". Brown lived in Clinton.

References 

1838 births
Year of death uncertain
Independent MLAs in British Columbia